Philip Goldsworthy (~1737 – 1801), was a British Army officer. He was a Member of Parliament for Wilton and chief equerry to King George III. Goldsworthy was a Lieutenant General and Colonel of The Royals.

Personal life and family
Goldsworthy was the second son of Burrington Goldsworthy, British consul at Leghorn and later Cadiz, and his wife Philippia Vanbrugh niece of Sir John Vanbrugh. He was baptised at Leghorn on the 18 October 1737.

Military career
Goldsworthy was commissioned as a cornet in the 1st Dragoons in 1756. He was promoted to lieutenant in 1760, to captain in 1768 and to major in 1776. He went on to be promoted to lieutenant colonel in 1779 and to colonel in 1784 and was appointed chief equerry (to the King) and clerk martial on 9 March 1788. He was then promoted to major general in 1793 and to lieutenant general in 1799. He served as colonel of 1st (Royal) Regiment of Dragoons from 23 January 1794 until his death.

Parliament
He represented the parliamentary borough of Wilton in Wiltshire during two terms in the Parliament of Great Britain and shortly in the Parliament of the United Kingdom. He served from 2 February 1785 to January 1788, and 15 February 1794 to 4  January 1801.

Posterity
He died unmarried at his seat Wilton Wiltshire 4 January 1801.

References
General:
 Namier, Sir Lewis and Brooke, John. The House of Commons 1754-1790 (1964), 
 Beck, Edward Josselyn. Memorials to Serve for a History of the Parish of St. Mary, Rotherhithe (1907)

In-text:

1737 births
1801 deaths
1st The Royal Dragoons officers
British Army lieutenant generals
British Army personnel of the French Revolutionary Wars
British MPs 1784–1790
British MPs 1790–1796
British MPs 1796–1800
Equerries
People educated at Westminster School, London
Members of the Parliament of Great Britain for English constituencies
Members of the Parliament of the United Kingdom for English constituencies
People from Wilton, Wiltshire
UK MPs 1801–1802